HMS Southsea Castle was a 32-gun fifth rate built under contract by John Knowler of Redbridge (Southampton) in 1695/96.

She was the first vessel to bear the name Southsea Castle in the English and Royal Navy.

Construction and Specifications
She was ordered on 3 May 1695 to be built under contract by John Knowler of Redbridge (Southampton). She was launched on 1 August 1696. Her builder's measure tonnage was calculated as 373 tons (burthen).

The gun armament initially was four demi-culverins on the lower deck (LD) with two pair of guns per side. The upper deck (UD) battery would consist of between twenty and twenty-two 6-pounder guns with ten or eleven guns per side. The gun battery would be completed by four 4-pounder guns on the quarterdeck (QD) with two to three guns per side.

Commissioned Service 1696-1697
She was commissioned in 1696 under the command of Captain Samuel Whitaker. In 1697 she was under Commander Thomas Legge to sail with a Virginia bound convoy.

Loss
She was wrecked on the Dove Sands off Hoylake (Wirral) on 15 September 1697.

Notes

Citations

References

 Winfield (2009), British Warships in the Age of Sail (1603 – 1714), by Rif Winfield, published by Seaforth Publishing, England © 2009, EPUB 
 Colledge (2020), Ships of the Royal Navy, by J.J. Colledge, revised and updated by Lt Cdr Ben Warlow and Steve Bush, published by Seaforth Publishing, Barnsley, Great Britain, © 2020, EPUB 
 Lavery (1989), The Arming and Fitting of English Ships of War 1600 - 1815, by Brian Lavery, published by US Naval Institute Press © Brian Lavery 1989, Part V Guns, Type of Guns
 Clowes (1898), The Royal Navy, A History from the Earliest Times to the Present (Vol. II). London. England: Sampson Low, Marston & Company, © 1898

 

Frigates of the Royal Navy
Ships of the Royal Navy
1690s ships